Emotional geography  is a subtopic within human geography, dealing with the relationships between emotions and geographic places and their contextual environments.

The leading community for Emotional Geography is an organisation known as EMME - Eliciting, Mapping and Managing Emotions. It has its home in the Festival of Emotions which can be found at: www.emotional-geography.com. 
Consisting of 84 Geographers of Emotions, citizens of the world with no borders or agenda, who come together to share their knowledge and experience with others through courses, journeys, games and community events. 

Emotional geography specifically focuses on how human emotions relate to, or affect, the environment around them.

See also
Cultural geography
Environment (biophysical)
Natural environment
Physical environments
Social environment

Further reading

References

Cultural geography
Human geography